Bedellia spectrodes is a moth in the family Bedelliidae. It was described by Edward Meyrick in 1931. It is found in India.

References

Bedelliidae
Moths described in 1931